A sundress or summer dress is an informal or casual dress intended to be worn in warm weather, typically in a lightweight fabric, most commonly cotton, and usually loose-fitting. It is commonly a bodice style sleeveless dress, typically with a wide neckline and thin shoulder straps, and may be backless. A sundress is typically worn without a layering top and is not usually worn over a blouse, sweater, or t-shirt, or with leggings.

While the word "sundress" was first used in the early 1940s, they really came into vogue in the 1950s, and were especially popularized by Lilly Pulitzer in the 1960s.

Current styles
The sundress is considered by many people to be both more practical and more comfortable than other varieties of dresses, particularly in warm or hot weather.

Sundresses can be of any neckline and hemline, ranging from mini to full length, though they are more often midi or maxi length. They are typically sleeveless and collarless, with a wide neckline and thin shoulder straps.

Sundresses can use a variety of closure types, including back zippers, side zippers, front buttons, back buttons, back ties, pullover or other closure styles. They may also be without any closures or fasteners and put on over the head or slipped on by pulling up from below. A lot of sundresses have patterns on them, the most common being a floral pattern. 

Since the 1940s, a sundress-like one-piece swimsuit appeared, which is sometimes considered to be matronly or costumey nowadays.

See also
Jumper dress
Sarafan

References

External links

 "Leading Questions; Buttoned Up, Or a Little Bare?", The New York Times, June 25, 1989
 Definition, Dictionary.com

1960s fashion
1970s fashion
1980s fashion
1990s fashion
2000s fashion
2010s fashion
Dresses
History of fashion